The Konstal 105Na are a class of Polish trams manufactured from 1979 to 1992 in workshops Konstal Chorzow, Poland. The meter-gauge version is designated as 805Na. As of 2016 they are still the most common trams in Poland.

Construction 
105Na is unidirectional motor tramcar, equipped with four doors.

It is a development of the earlier Konstal 105N. The main changes being a shift in the location of the electrical equipment from under the steps to the back wall of the driver's cabin, the introduction of a separate cabin for the driver, as well as the removal of the small windows under the front and side windscreens. The most important change was the introduction of motor grouping, which reduced the energy consumption by 12%. During initial acceleration, the four motors are connected in series, whilst at higher speeds, two groups of motors are connected in parallel.

While in service, the 105Na vehicles were the subject of various modifications and upgrades (including changes in the electrical system, new front plastic, change of the door opening mechanism, and even re-design, for Poznań, to the bidirectional Konstal 105NaDK). Almost all 105N cars in Poland have over time been modernised to the 105Na standard.

Other variants 

The Konstal 105Na and 805Na trams provided the basis for the production of a large number of prototypes and variants:

105Nb - new doors and bogies, 15 units built in 1988-1993
105Nb/e - slightly modified electrical system, 6 units built in 1994
105Ne - slightly thicker walls, 18 units built in 1993
105Nf - modernized brakes and drivers console, 44 units built in 1994-1996
105Ng - three doors, static converter and modified breaks, 2 units built in 1993 additional units obtained by modernizing 105Na
105Nm - similar to 105Nf but with a static converter, 14 units built in 1996-1997
105Np - static converter, single unit built in 1994
105NT - thyristor based, 13 units built in 1985–1989, later converted to standard 105Na
105Nz - thyristor based and asynchronous motor, 2 units built in 1997
105N1k - similar to 105Ng but thyristor based, 3 units built in 1995
105N1k2 - similar to 105N1k but with electrical systems from a different supplier, 60 units built in 1995-2000
105N2k2000 - similar to 105N1k2 with a plastic front and rear, 36 units built in 2001
106N - thyristor based, 7 units built in 1977–1987,  later converted to standard 105Na
106Na - thyristor based, 8 units built in 1991-1993
805Nb - meter-gauge version of the 105Nb
805NS - meter-gauge with new accelerator, 12 units built in 1984-1990
111N - with doors on both sides - two 111N cars connected back-to-back could work as a bidirectional tram, 6 units built in 1993

Production numbers 

The number of standard-gauge version 105Na vehicles produced is 1443 while the number narrow-gauge version, the 805Na, is 691.

Operators 

These trams were used in all Polish cities which operate a tram system and they are the largest group in the stock.

Gallery

References

Tram vehicles of Poland